Nick Ingels (born 2 September 1984) is a Belgian professional road bicycle racer, riding for UCI Professional Continental team Topsport Vlaanderen in 2008.

Palmarès 

 Omloop Het Volk - U23 version (2005)
 3rd, European U23 Road Race Championship (2005)

External links 
Profile at Predictor-Lotto official website

Belgian male cyclists
1984 births
Living people
Cyclists from East Flanders
People from Eeklo
21st-century Belgian people